Sandra y Paulina is a Mexican telenovela produced by Valentín Pimstein for Televisa in 1980.

Cast 
Jacqueline Andere as Sandra Antonelli/Paulina
Julio Alemán as Andrés
Angélica Aragón as Isabel
Gaston Tuset as Octavio
Claudio Brook as El Viejo
Connie de la Mora as Silvia
Elizabeth Aguilar as Lulu
Raúl Meraz as Don Aurelio
Javier Marc as Daniel
Juan Verduzco as Ruben
Maribella García as Regina
Gustavo Ganem as Marco
Porfirio Bas as Beto
Manuel Armenta as Investigator
Felix Santaella as Rafael
Alfredo García Marquez as Publicist
Oscar Narvaez as Agent
Blas Garcia as Esteban

References

External links 

Mexican telenovelas
1980 telenovelas
Televisa telenovelas
Spanish-language telenovelas
1980 Mexican television series debuts
1980 Mexican television series endings